Dimitri Rougeul, (born 7 September 1981 in Thiais) is a French actor who specializes in dubbing.

Filmography

Cinema 
 1987 : Voulez-vous mourir avec moi ?
 1989 : Vanille Fraise
 1990 : L'Opération Corned-Beef
 1992 : La Crise
 1994 : Quand j'avais cinq ans je m'ai tué
 1995 : Au petit Marguery

Television

TV specials 
 1991 : Appelez-moi Tonton from Dominique Baron
 1991 :  Les Ritals from Marcel Bluwal.
 1994 : L'Île aux mômes – TV special from Caroline Huppert : Alexandre
 1995  : Le sang du renard from Serge Meynard, avec Marianne Basler
 1997 : Entre terre et mer ou Le Grand Banc, French miniseries with 6 episodes created and directed by Hervé Baslé: Félix Guibert
 1998 : Beautiful Grandmother from Marion Sarrault.
 2000 : Patagonia's Friend  from Olivier Langlois.
 2009 : I, François Villon from Serge Meynard.

Television series 
 Commissaire Moulin : Nicolas Fournier ("The Little Home" episode)
 P.J. – Season 7: Florent
 The Eloise Investigations Rome, produced by Christophe Douchand (2003)
 The Emergency Medical Team : 2 episodes – Paparazzi (2007), Je t'aime un peu, beaucoup (2008)

Dubbing

Cinema 
 Jumanji : Alan Parish (child) (French dub)
 The River Wild : Roarke Hartman (French dub)
 The Santa Clause : Charlie Calvin (French dub)
 The Lion King : Young Simba (French dub)
 Thumbelina : Little Bees (French dub)
 An American Tail: Fievel Goes West : Fievel Mousekewitz (French dub)
 An American Tail: The Treasure of Manhattan Island : Tony Topponi (French dub)
 Bambi : Young Thumper (French dub)
 A Bronx Tale : Calogero 'C' Anello (9 years old) (French dub)
 The Mighty Ducks : Peter (French dub)
 Home Alone 2: Lost in New York : Fuller (French dub)

Television 
 Summerland : Cameron Bale (season 2) (French dub)
 Alles was zählt : Jan Niklas Berg (Ben Roschinski) (French dub)
 Recess : Vince (French dub)
 United States of Tara : Marshall (French dub)
 Roméo : Romeo Miller (Lil' Romeo) (French dub)
 The Little Prince : Thery (French dub)
 The Replacements : Todd Daring (French dub)
 Toriko : Komatsu (Anime adaptation, French dub)

Theater 
 1994 : On purge bébé by Georges Feydeau, stage performance by Bernard Murat, Théâtre Édouard VII
 1997 : Les Côtelettes by Bertrand Blier, stage performance by Bernard Murat, Théâtre de la Porte-Saint-Martin

External links 
 https://web.archive.org/web/20130712231427/http://dimitri-rougeul.com/ Official site

1981 births
Living people
French male child actors
French male film actors
French male television actors
French male voice actors